Colonel Evan George Stewart (史伊尹上校) DSO, OBE, ED, MA (1892–1958) was a British soldier and missionary to China.

Biography
He was born on March 27, 1892 in Bedford, the seventh child of the Rev Robert Warren Stewart MA and Louisa (née Smyly), both CMS missionaries in China who were then on home leave. Stewart went with his parents to their mission station in Kucheng, Fukien Province, East China, in 1893 and was with them in 1895 at a nearby hill station called Hwa-sang when they were attacked by an insurgent group, the so-called "Vegetarians", who were opposed to all foreigners, particularly missionaries.

His parents were killed as were one of his brothers, Herbert (aged 6), and one of his sisters, Hilda (aged 1), and their nursemaid. Evan survived, although it is said that he was hit on the head by a rifle butt, and was rescued from the then burning house by his sister Kathleen (aged 11), who also rescued their sister Mildred (aged 13) whose leg had been slashed by a sword. His elder brothers, Arthur, Philips and James, were at school in England.

The surviving children were taken to Dublin to their grandfather's large house, Gortleitragh, in Kingstown (renamed Dún Laoghaire in 1922), where Evan, with his brother and sisters, were brought up by their uncles and aunts. Later they were looked after by their Aunt Emily ("Tem") at her home, Brighton Lodge, in nearby Monkstown.

Educated in Dublin and then as a boarder at Wellington College where he shone at Mathematics, History and in Athletics winning the English Public Schools 100 yds sprint.

On leaving school in 1910, went to Hong Kong to teach at St. Paul's College where his older brother Arthur was headmaster; this was partly to raise money to attend University. Joined "The Hong Kong Volunteers" in 1910 and was soon commissioned, thanks to his officer training in the O.T.C. at Wellington.

In 1913 returned to Dublin to attend Trinity as an undergraduate, reading History. In 1915, with the war becoming ever more demanding, he felt compelled to join up before completing his degree course although, as an undergraduate, he was then exempt from military service. He was commissioned immediately and volunteered for a machine-gun regiment, the Middlesex. He served in France, was wounded twice and on one occasion returned to Dublin to convalesce. In France, briefly met his brother James, an Army padre who was killed in 1916, and later another brother, Philips who was a Major in the RAMC. By the end of the war he was a Captain, acting Major, having been "on active service from 1915 to 1919".

After the trauma of trench warfare he did not feel able to resume his degree course immediately so returned to Hong Kong in 1920 to teach again at St. Paul's College. However, realizing that he would need a degree to be fully acceptable as a teacher, took an external London University Degree in History, graduating in 1925. In 1926 Trinity College granted him its Degree and the "right to wear the cap and gown of a graduate of the College" because his studies "had been interrupted by military service".

In 1928 married Dorothy Sarah Lander, daughter of the Rt. Rev. G. H. Lander, Bishop of Hong Kong from 1907 to 1920 and a previous headmaster of St. Paul's College. She was the younger sister of Kathleen, his brother Arthur's wife. They had one son, Robert Michael, born in 1931. He took over as Headmaster of St. Paul's College, in succession to his brother, in 1930, and remained headmaster, with the break of wartime, until his death.

When the Japanese invaded Hong Kong in 1941 he was a major commanding the HKVDC No. 3 (Machine-Gun) Company, first on Stonecutters Island and later in the Wong Nei Chong Gap area. His actions were to result in an award of the Distinguished Service Order for which the citation noted that the successful evacuation of Stonecutters while under fire was greatly due to his powers of organization and leadership. While at Wong Nei Chong Gap, although wounded early in the fighting, he continued to command his company with a total disregard for his own safety and suffering.

After the capture of Wong Nei Chong Gap by the enemy he organized the escape with six survivors from that area and finally found his own way back alone through the enemy lines. Throughout, his conduct was an example to all of high courage and coolness. During the fighting at Wong Nei Chong Gap, his company suffered 100% casualties in officers and over 80% in other ranks.

Before the start of hostilities, his wife and son had been evacuated to the Philippines and then to Sydney. After the surrender on Christmas Day 1941 he was interned as a prisoner of war in the Argyle Street Camp. His wounds could not be properly treated and so, combined with malnutrition, he became severely ill so that on Liberation he was evacuated first to Australia and then to England to Stoke Mandeville Orthopaedic Hospital.

Returned to Hong Kong in 1947, despite a "dropped-foot" resulting from an inadequately treated shrapnel wound in his spine, he reopened the St. Paul's College, which had been temporarily restarted as a co-educational school by Katie Wu.

He was Chairman of the HK Inter-Schools Sport Committee, Chairman of the HK School Certificate Panel, a member of the HK University Court, a member of St. John's Cathedral Council (and a Sidesman at the cathedral), a member of St. John's College Council, on the Government's Appeals Board and was on served other Boards.

Joined the Hong Kong Regiment, the successor unit to the Hong Kong Defence Corps, and in 1950 transferred to the Home Guard and took over command from October 1954 to 1956. Led the Hong Kong Regiment's contingent in the Coronation Procession in London in 1954, chaired the committee on the history of the HKVDC and was awarded the OBE in 1955. Served as Honorary Colonel of the Hong Kong Regiment from March 1958 until his death later that year.

He died at age 66 on December 17, 1958, when still Headmaster of St. Paul's College, mainly from the effects of his time as a prisoner-of-war. His very well attended memorial service was in St. John's Cathedral on 23 December and his ashes were dispersed in the ground of St. Paul's College, which had played such a large part in his life.

References

Hong Kong Volunteers in Battle

External links
  St. Paul's College

1892 births
1958 deaths
British Army personnel of World War I
People educated at Wellington College, Berkshire
British colonial army officers
British World War II prisoners of war
World War II prisoners of war held by Japan
People from Bedford
Principals of St. Paul's College, Hong Kong
Military personnel from Bedford